Liao Shantao (4 January 1920 - 6 June 1997) was a Chinese mathematician.

Biography
Liao was born into a family of farming background on January 4, 1920, in Hengshan County, Hunan. His father was Liao Zihao and his mother was Zeng Ping. He attended Mingde Middle School and Changsha No. 1 High School in Changsha, capital of Hunan province. In 1938 he was accepted to National Southwestern Associated University and graduated in 1941. After graduation, he taught at Mingde Middle School. He moved to Peking University in 1946 as an associate professor and then to Academia Sinica as a research assistant in 1948.  He pursued advanced studies in the United States, earning his doctor's degree from the University of Chicago in 1952. His doctoral dissertation was directed by Shiing-Shen Chern. He did post-doctoral research at Princeton University from 1953 to 1955.

Liao gave up the job that mathematician Norman Steenrod had arranged for him in scientific research at Princeton University and returned to China in 1956 as a professor at Peking University.

In 1986 he was elected a fellow of The World Academy of Sciences.

In 1991 he was elected an academician of the Chinese Academy of Sciences.

Personal life
Liao married Wang Hongyi in 1942, the couple had three sons.

Awards
 1982 Second Class Prize of State Natural Science Award
 1988 First Class Prize of State Natural Science Award

References

1920 births
1997 deaths
Educators from Hunan
Mathematicians from Hunan
Members of the Chinese Academy of Sciences
National Southwestern Associated University alumni
Academic staff of Peking University
People from Hengyang
TWAS fellows
TWAS laureates
University of Chicago alumni
Chinese expatriates in the United States